The Museum of Black Arkansans and Performing Arts Center is a museum and performing arts venue at 1224 South Louisiana Street in Little Rock, Arkansas.  It is located on the former campus of the First Baptist Church of Little Rock, an historic property listed on the National Register of Historic Places in 1994.  The former church, built in 1941, is a prominent local example of Collegiate Gothic architecture, designed by local architect A.N. McAninch.  Little Rock's First Baptist congregation now meets at 62 Pleasant Valley Drive.

Mission
The museum was established in 1993 by Ernie Dodson, and was first known as "Ernie's Museum of Black Arkansans", and is still often referred to by the acronym EMOBA.  Its stated mission is to "promote awareness of Arkansas’s black history and to create unity and personal pride within the community, schools, colleges, and universities by recognizing those black Arkansans who were the first or best in their fields, showcasing how black struggles and achievements have influenced the development of Arkansas. It is working to develop a performing arts theater to highlight and train African-American artists." It is open by appointment.

See also
National Register of Historic Places listings in Little Rock, Arkansas

References

Baptist churches in Arkansas
Churches on the National Register of Historic Places in Arkansas
Gothic Revival church buildings in Arkansas
Churches completed in 1941
Churches in Little Rock, Arkansas
Museums in Little Rock, Arkansas
National Register of Historic Places in Little Rock, Arkansas
Museums established in 1993
1993 establishments in Arkansas
Collegiate Gothic architecture in Arkansas
African-American museums in Arkansas
Performing arts centers in Arkansas
Event venues on the National Register of Historic Places in Arkansas